St Conan's Kirk is located in the village of Loch Awe in Argyll and Bute, Scotland. In a 2016 Royal Incorporation of Architects in Scotland public poll it was voted one of the Top 10 buildings in Scotland of the last 100 years. It was established as a chapel of ease by the Campbells of Innis Chonan. The church is protected as a category A listed building.

Architecture and fittings
It was designed by the architect  Walter Douglas Campbell, a younger brother of Archibald Campbell, 1st Baron Blythswood. It was built in 1881–6; and substantially extended from 1906 to 1914, the year of his death. Campbell also designed in similar style the family mansion nearby on Innis Chonain for himself, his artist sister Helen and mother, the elderly Mrs Caroline Campbell of Blythswood, formerly resident in Blythswood House downriver from Glasgow. An eclectic blend of church styles,  from  ancient Roman to Norman, it is built of local stone. It consists of a nave and chancel, with the chancel-stalls being canopied. Large, unsmoothed boulders of granite from nearby Ben Cruachan, form the piers which carry the chancel arch, and the transepts make the Sacred Cross. There is also a tower and spire. Walter was unmarried and left no heirs. His sister Helen Douglas Campbell ensured that final work was in progress by 1927, the year of her death. The Kirk was consecrated in 1930.

Fittings included a small organ. One ancient window from South Leith Parish Church was re-used at St Conan's. It also houses a fragment of bone that is said to have come from Robert the Bruce, King of Scotland.

Chapels
There are also three chapels within St Conan's Kirk. The Bruce Chapel contains a carved wood and alabaster effigy of Robert the Bruce. The St Brides Chapel contains a carved effigy of Walter Douglas Campbell. The St Conval's Chapel is dedicated to the 4th Lord Blythswood. The metalwork gates on the St Brides and St Conval's Chapel were made by Thomas Hadden.

Ownership
Although used for services by the local Church of Scotland Parish, with services on the first Sunday of each month the Kirk was bequeathed to the independent St Conan's Church Trust (SC012643). In 2014 a friends organisation, Friends of St Conan's Kirk SCIO (SC045006) was formed to support the Kirk.

Related buildings
Other related buildings in the area of Lochawe village include Innis Chonain House, Badnaiska (Summer Manse) and the House of Letterawe, the former home of the author Mary Stewart (novelist).

Gallery

See also
  Blythswood Hill Glasgow
 Archibald Douglas, 4th Baron Blythswood - Buried at St Conan
 Friends of St Conan's Kirk

References

External links

Overview of St. Conan's Kirk
Video footage of the Bruce Chapel and Ossuary

Church of Scotland churches in Scotland
Churches in Argyll and Bute
Loch Awe
Churches completed in 1886
Listed churches in Scotland
Category A listed buildings in Argyll and Bute